Intiki Deepam Illalu is an Indian Telugu-language drama series that airs on Star Maa starring Dhanya Deepika, Shiva Kumar, Rajashri Nair, Priyanka Chowdhary and Manoj. It is a remake of the Hindi television series Saath Nibhaana Saathiya. In 2021, Neema Singh replaced Priyanka Chowdhary as Raashi. The series is produced by Yepuru Srinadh and Padmin Nadella.

Plot
Being an adopted daughter of Jayaram and Damayanthi, Krishna gets mistreated by Damayanthi and their daughter Raashi. Innocent, soft-spoken and kind hearted Krishna had always yearned for love. Maheshwari chooses Krishna for her son Manohar and get them married while Manohar's cousin Harsha and Raashi get married. The story revolves around her struggles to win the heart of her husband Manohar, who does not love her with her strict mother in law Maheshwari turning mentor for her, amidst which Raashi hatches various plans to defame Krishna and separate her from the family. Varshini, Mano's sister is set to marry Uday, the brother of Mano's former love interest Hema. Varshini acts as if she is pregnant with Uday's progeny to convince Maheshwari for getting her married to Uday. On the wedding day, Uday abducts Krishna when the latter discovers that he is acting as if he loves Varshini and is getting married to her to take revenge on Mano for getting married to Krishna despite being in a relationship with Hema. 

Raashi saves Krishna and they expose Uday, who is banished. Therefore, Varshini is forced to marry Raashi's brother Surya. Though after some tribulations; Surya-Varshini and Krishna-Manohar fall in love. Varshini is protected from Uday's evil conspiracies and she accepts Krishna as her sister-in-law and mother-figure. Uday is revealed to be Krishna's cousin. Krishna's biological parents were murdered by Uday's father for her property when she was a toddler. After Raashi has a miscarriage, she puts the blame on Krishna. Due to conflicts, the house is divided into two with a line drawn separating it. Maheshwari, Krishna, Manohar and the latter's father live on one side of the house while Harsha, his parents Leelavathi and Jagadish and Raasi live on other side. Maheshwari moves out of the house with her family after discovering that Varshini was modelling in Uday's agency and was having an affair with him few days after her marriage. Leelavathi and Jagadish realize their mistake and tries to unite with Maheshwari and buys a house in their neighbourhood. Manohar gets drunk under Raasi's influence and forces himself upon Krishna, who gets pregnant due to it. She has an internal conflict with Manohar which is hidden from an excited Maheshwari. When Maheshwari discovers the truth, she leaves the house, meets with an accident and is presumed to be dead. However, she is alive and is unhappy, so she does not return home. 

Manohar blames Krishna for Maheshwari's death and they decide to get divorced. Harsha gets romantically involved with a businesswoman Harika who joins their office and troubles Raasi. Krishna and Manohar are asked to stay with each other for six months together by court for reconsidering their divorce decision. Maheshwari starts living with a couple after saving one of their lives. The trio start a catering business and Varshini-Surya approach them as they have a curry point. Everyone discovers that Maheshwari is alive.

Cast

Main
 Dhanya Deepika as Krishnapriya aka Krishna: Srinivasa Raju and Lakshmi's daughter; Jayaram and Damayanthi's foster daughter; Surya and Raashi's foster sister; Uday and Hema's cousin; Mano's wife (2021–present)
 Shiva Kumar as Manohar aka Mano: Maheshwari Devi and Prasad's son; Varshini's brother; Harsha's cousin; Hema's former lover; Krishna's husband (2021–present)
 Rajshri Nair as Maheshwari Devi: Prasad's wife; Manohar and Varshini's mother (2021–present)

Recurring
 Priyanka Chowdhary / Neema Singh as Raasi: Jayaram and Damayanthi's daughter; Surya's sister; Krishna's foster sister; Harsha's wife (2021) / (2021–present)
 Manoj as Harsha: Jagadish and Leelavathi's son; Mano and Varshini's cousin; Raasi's husband (2021–present)
 Niharika as Harika: Harsha's former affair-interest and colleague; Raashi's rival (2022–present)
 Anusha Sasurala as Hema: Harinarayana's daughter; Uday's sister; Krishna's cousin; Varshini's ex-best friend; Mano's former love interest and obsessive lover (2021-2022)
 Nikitha Chowdary as Varshini: Prasad and Maheshwari's daughter; Mano's sister; Harsha's cousin; Hema's best friend; Uday's former love interest; Surya's widow (2021–present)
 Vikram Shanmukha as Uday: Hari's son; Hema's brother; Krishna's cousin; Varshini's former love interest (2021–present)
 Sravani as Damayanthi: Jayaram's wife; Raasi and Surya's mother; Krishna's foster mother (2021-present)
 Yarlagadda Sailaja as Ratnaprabha: Jagadish and Prasad's mother; Mano, Harsha and Varshini's grandmother (2021–2022)
 Sreedhar as Jayaram: Damayanthi's husband; Raasi and Surya's father; Krishna's foster father (2021–2022)
 Durga Devi as Leelavathi: Jagadish's wife; Harsha's mother; Raasi's mother-in-law (2021–present)
 Nawaz Shan as Harinarayana: Srinavasa Raju's brother; Uday and Hema's father (2021-present)
 Girish as Jagadish: Leelavathi's husband; Harsha's father; Raasi's father-in-law; Ratnaprabha's elder son; Prasad's elder brother; Mano and Varshini's uncle (2021–present)
 Uma Devi as Harinarayana's mother-in-law (2021)
 Nagireddy Surya as Surya: Jayaram and Damayanthi's son; Raashi's elder brother; Krishna's foster brother; Varshini's husband (2021–2023) (killed of)
 Unknown as Prasad: Maheshwari's husband; Mano and Varshini's father; Krishna's father-in-law; Ratnaprabha's younger son; Jagadish's younger brother; Harsha's uncle (2021–2022)

Cameo
 Bharani Shankar as Srinivasa Raju: Lakshmi's husband; Krishna's biological father; Hari's elder brother (2021) (dead)
 Pravaleeka as Lakshmi: Srinivasa Raju's wife; Krishna's biological mother (2021) (dead)

References

External links 

 Intiki Deepam Illalu on Disney+ Hotstar

Indian television series
2020s Indian television series
Indian television soap operas
Serial drama television series
2021 Indian television series debuts
Telugu-language television shows
Indian drama television series
Star Maa original programming